El perdón de los pecados (English title: The forgiveness of sins) is a Venezuelan telenovela written by Ibsen Martínez and produced by Venevisión in 1996.

Carolina Perpetuo and Daniel Alvarado starred as the main protagonists, accompanied by Elluz Peraza, Yanis Chimaras and Milena Santander.

Plot
Calixto Maldonado is a working-class man who owes everything to Augusto Marquez-Cata, an ambitious politician who is his best friend. Due to their strong friendship, Calixto has the opportunity of entering and interacting in the social and financial circles of high society, therefore making him Augusto's figurehead. However, their close friendship will be put to the test with the arrival of a young and beautiful woman with two names, Margarita Guanchez who comes from an affluent family in the provinces to escape to the city.

Cast

 Carolina Perpetuo as Margarita Guanchez / Margot Fuentes 
 Daniel Alvarado as Calixto Maldonado
 Elluz Peraza as Amnerys Balza
 Yanis Chimaras as Augusto Márquez Cata
 Milena Santander as Ninfa  
 Miguel Ángel Landa as Arturo Ramos 
 Raúl Amundaray as Marco Aurelio Antonioni   
 Janin Barboza as Eugenia   
 Javier Valcárcel as Efrain  
 Elizabeth Morales 
 Mauricio González as Julian Guanchez
 Isabel Moreno as Hilda Cristina Ramos 
 Pedro Marthan  
 Alejandro Corona as Filadelfo 
 Lucy Orta   
 Marcos Campos as Ivan 
 Marisela Buitriago   
 María Elena Coello as Ana Teresa
 Elio Pietrini as Pujols 
 Carmen Francia  
 Zamira Segura 
 Zoe Bolívar  
 Aitor Gaviria as Osvaldo  
 Tatiana Padrón 
 Julio Mujica 
 Martha Tarazona 
 Umberto Buonocuore as Mario
 Ana Martínez   
 Estrella Castellanos

References

External links
 

1996 telenovelas
Venevisión telenovelas
1996 Venezuelan television series debuts
1997 Venezuelan television series endings
Venezuelan telenovelas
Spanish-language telenovelas
Television shows set in Venezuela